Traditionally, a delicatessen or deli is a retail establishment that sells a selection of fine, exotic, or foreign prepared foods. Delicatessen originated in Germany during the 18th century and spread to the United States in the mid-19th century. European immigrants to the United States, especially Ashkenazi Jews, popularized the delicatessen in U.S. culture beginning in the late 19th century what is now known as a Jewish deli. More recently, many larger retail stores like supermarkets have "deli" sections.

Etymology 

The first U.S. short version of this word, deli, came into existence probably after World War II (first evidence from 1948).

History
The German food company Dallmayr is credited with being the first delicatessen created. In 1700, it became the first store to import bananas, mangoes, and plums to the German population from faraway places such as the Canary Islands and China. Over 300 years later, it remains the largest business of its kind in Europe.

The first delicatessens to appear in the United States were in New York City in the early 1880s, with the first advertised use of this word occurring in early 1884 in St. Louis, Missouri upon the opening of "Sprague's Delicatessen," at first one lunchroom and eventually five popular downtown lunch establishments operating between 1884 and 1906. Early delicatessens in New York catered to the German immigrant population living there. As the German-Jewish population increased in New York City during the mid- to late 1800s, kosher delicatessens began to open; the first was founded in 1889. In the United States, by the late 20th to early 21st centuries, supermarkets, local economy stores, and fast food outlets began using the word (often abbreviated as "deli") to describe sections of their stores. The decline of the deli as an independent retail establishment was most noted in New York City: from a high in the 1930s of about 1,500 Jewish delicatessens, only 15 still existed in 2015.

By country and region

Australia 

In most of Australia, the term "delicatessen" retains its European meaning of high-quality, expensive foods and stores. Large supermarket chains often have a deli department, and independent delicatessens exist throughout the country. Both types of deli offer a variety of cured meats, sausages, pickled vegetables, dips, breads, and olives.

In South Australia and Western Australia, "deli" also denotes a small convenience store or milk bar, and some businesses use "deli" as part of their business name. Traditional delicatessens also exist in these states, with "continental delicatessen" sometimes used to indicate the European version.

Canada 
In Canada, both meanings of "delicatessen" are used. Customers of European origin often use the term in a manner consistent with its original German meaning, but as in the United States, a deli can be a combined grocery store and restaurant.

Europe 

In Europe "delicatessen" means high-quality, expensive foods, and stores. European delicatessens include Fauchon in Paris, Dallmayr in Munich, Julius Meinl am Graben in Vienna, Harrods and Fortnum & Mason in London, Peck in Milan, and Jelmoli in Zürich.

Although U.S.-style delicatessens are also found in Europe, they appeal to the luxury market. In Russia, shops and supermarket sections approximating U.S.-style delis are called  and offer salads and main courses. Delicate meats and cheeses, cold-cut and sliced hot, are sold in a separate section. The Eliseevsky food store in central Moscow, with its fin de siècle decor, is similar to a European delicatessen. From the Tsarist era, it was preserved by the Soviets as an outlet for difficult-to-obtain Russian delicacies. Delicatessens may also provide foods from other countries and cultures that are not readily available in local food stores.

Ireland 
In Ireland, delis serve pre-prepared "food to go". This trend began in the 1990s and led to the emergence of many ready-to-eat deli products. Delis can be found at a wide variety of convenience shops, newsagents, supermarkets, petrol stations, and casual eateries throughout Ireland.

Popular items served at hot deli counters include chicken fillet rolls (breaded chicken fillet on a bread roll), breakfast rolls (Irish breakfast items on a bread roll), jambons, sausage rolls, and potato wedges.

United States 

In the United States, a delicatessen (or deli) is often a combined grocery store and restaurant, although the term may also be used for a strictly take-out or sit-down restaurant. Delis offer a broader, fresher menu than fast-food chains, rarely employing fryers (except for chicken) and routinely preparing sandwiches to order.

American delis sell cold cuts by weight. In addition to made-to-order sandwiches, many American delicatessens offer made-to-order green salads. Prepared pasta, potato, chicken, and tuna salads, or other salads are sometimes displayed under the counter and sold by weight. Precooked chicken, shrimp, or eggplant dishes may also be sold. Delicatessens offer a variety of beverages, such as pre-packaged soft drinks, coffee, tea, and milk. Potato chips and similar products, newspapers, and small items such as candy and mints are also usually available.

Delicatessens from a number of cultures can be found in the United States, including Italian, Greek, and Jewish, both kosher and "kosher style". The American equivalent of a European delicatessen may be known as a gourmet food store.

See also 

 Appetizing store
 Charcuterie
 List of delicatessens
 Jewish deli
 Osteria
 Pastrami on rye
 Salumeria
 Salumi
 Save the Deli – a book about the decline of the Jewish delicatessen
 Specialty foods
 Traiteur
 Trattoria

References

Further reading 
 Merwin, Ted. Pastrami on Rye: An Overstuffed History of the Jewish Deli (New York University Press, 2015.) xviii, 245 pp.

External links 

 "Deli Paradise Travel Guide". Travel Channel.
 Los Angeles Delis. Thrillist.
 New York Delis. Time Out.

 
Food retailing
German cuisine
Italian cuisine
Jewish cuisine
Restaurants by type